Ovamboland, also referred to as Owamboland, was a Bantustan in South West Africa (present-day Namibia), the apartheid government stated that the goal was for it to be a self-governing homeland for the Ovambo people. However, practically it was intended by the apartheid government as a reservation that forced them into cheap labor by limiting movement; Ovambo men were not allowed outside Ovamboland unless they signed as a contract laborer for 16 months, while women were not allowed out at all.

The term originally referred to the parts of northern Namibia inhabited by the Ovambo ethnic group, namely the area controlled by the traditional Ovambo kingdoms in pre-colonial and early colonial times, such as Ondonga, Ongandjera, and Oukwanyama. Its endonym is Ovambo ~ Owambo.

Background

In the 1960s South Africa, which was administering South West Africa under a League of Nations mandate, came under increased international pressure regarding its minority White rule over the majority of Blacks. The solution envisaged by South Africa—the Odendaal Plan—was to separate the white and the non-white population, grant self-government to the isolated black territories, and thus make Whites the majority population in the vast remainder of the country. Moreover it was envisaged that by separating each ethnic group and confining people by law to their restricted areas, discrimination by race would automatically disappear.

The demarcated territories were called the bantustans, and the remainder of the land was called the Police Zone. Forthwith, all non-white people employed in the Police Zone became migrant workers, and pass laws were established to police movement in and out of the bantustans.

The combined territory of all bantustans was roughly equal in size to the Police Zone. However, all bantustans were predominantly rural and excluded major towns. All harbours, most of the railway network and the tarred road infrastructure, all larger airports, the profitable diamond areas and the national parks were situated in the Police Zone. An exception to this was Rehoboth, the bantustan status of which was similar to the autonomy previous under German rule.

Finnish Missionary work
The main religion of Ovamboland is Lutheranism, which is why Finnish missionaries, such as Martti Rautanen (who also developed the local literary language), and later Heikki Saari, among others, have worked in the area since the 1870s. As a result of the work of the Finnish envoys, the Ovambo-Kawango Evangelical Lutheran Church was born in 1954 (since 1984 the Evangelical Lutheran Church of Namibia). In their footsteps, there are many given names of Finnish origin in the local nomenclature, such as Martta, Toivo, Onni, Helmi and Martti. In the 1920s, there was even a project planned by Finnish university people to make Ovamboland the first colony of Finland, but this never happened.

Establishment
Ovamboland, set up in 1968, was the first fully functional Bantustan in South West Africa. As the Ovambo people already resided here, resettlement was not necessary. Furthermore, the area already had an existing structure of governance in the form of traditional authorities. The population was, however, split into those who farmed near their homes, and those who worked in mines, factories, on farms and in households outside the Bantustan. Self-government was granted in 1973.

Ovamboland was the setting of a protracted insurgency waged by the People's Liberation Army of Namibia (PLAN) during the South African Border War.

Since independence of Namibia 
Owambo, like other homelands in South West Africa, was abolished in May 1989 at the start of the transition to independence. The region is now commonly referred to as The North but the term Ovamboland is still in use. More than half of the entire population lives here on just 6% of the Namibian territory.

See also
Leaders of Ovamboland
Democratic Co-operative Party

References

External links

History of Namibia
Bantustans in South West Africa
States and territories established in 1968
Ovambo
States and territories disestablished in 1989
1968 establishments in South West Africa